The 1986 Connecticut gubernatorial election took place on November 4, 1986. Incumbent Democratic governor Bill O'Neill  won his second full term against Republican assemblywoman Julie Belaga, who defeated Jerry Labriola for the Republican nomination. This election marked the last time a Democrat would win the governorship in Connecticut until the 2010 election, and the last time a Democrat won by a margin of larger than 5 percent until the 2022 election.

Election results

References

Gubernatorial
1986
Connecticut